Godfred Kwadwo Asamoah (born 1 April 1996) is a Ghanaian professional footballer who plays as winger for Ghana Premier League side Medeama S.C. He previously had stints with Kpando Hearts of Lions, Dreams FC and Techiman Eleven Wonders.

Career

Kpando Hearts of Lions 
Asamoah featured for Kpando Hearts of Lions in the Ghana Division One League before securing a move to Dreams FC in 2018. He had his breakout season in the season of 2017, scoring six times and providing 19 assists for the Kpando-based club to help them place second in the Division One League Zone.

Dreams FC 
In January 2018, Asamoah signed for Ghana Premier League side Dreams FC from Hearts of Lions. He signed a three-year deal with the club after successfully passing his medicals. In his first season, during the 2018 Ghana Premier League season, he played in 13 league matches before the league was abandoned due to the dissolution of the Ghana Football Association (GFA) in June 2018, as a result of the Anas Number 12 Expose. The following season, he was limited to 3 league matches, causing him to sign a season long deal with Eleven Wonders the following season.

Eleven Wonders (loan) 
In 2019, Asamoah joined Techiman Eleven Wonders ahead of the 2019–20 Ghana Premier League season. He featured in 12 league matches, scored 1 goal and made 2 assists, before the league was cancelled as due to the outbreak of the COVID-19 pandemic.

Medeama SC 
On 16 October 2020, Tarkwa-based side Medeama SC announced the signing of Asamoah on a free transfer. He signed a two-year deal with the club ahead of the 2020–21 Ghana Premier League season. Coach Samuel Boadu praised him as being a versatile player who can be deployed in several positions and a good add to their Tarkwa outfit. He made his debut on 15 November 2020, coming on in the 66th minute for Michael Yeboah in a 1–1 draw against Accra Great Olympics. He scored his first goal against his former club Dreams FC in a 2–1 loss on 22 November 2020.

References

External links 
 

1996 births
Living people
Ghanaian footballers
Medeama SC players
Dreams F.C. (Ghana) players
Ghana Premier League players
Heart of Lions F.C. players
Techiman Eleven Wonders FC players
Association football midfielders